Giovanni Battista Primi (died 1657) was an Italian marine landscape and portrait painter.
He was a pupil of Agostino Tassi and a native of Rome. He resided a long time at Genoa, where he died of plague.

References

17th-century Italian painters
Italian male painters
Italian Baroque painters
Italian landscape painters
Painters from Genoa
1657 deaths
Year of birth unknown
17th-century deaths from plague (disease)